Jacques Jansen (3 August 1884 – 29 April 1954) was a Dutch composer. His work was part of the music event in the art competition at the 1928 Summer Olympics.

References

1884 births
1954 deaths
Dutch composers
Olympic competitors in art competitions
People from Den Helder